No Other Love may refer to:
"No Other Love" (1950 song), a song credited to Bob Russell and Paul Weston, based on an etude by Frédéric Chopin
"No Other Love" (1953 song), a song by Richard Rodgers and Oscar Hammerstein II
"No Other Love" (album), an album by Jo Stafford
No Other Love (1979 film), a television movie starring Richard Thomas and Julie Kavner
No Other Love (1982 film), a Filipino film directed by Joey Gosiengfiao and starring Snooky Serna and Albert Martinez
No Other Love (upcoming film)